Lisburn and Castlereagh is a local government district in Northern Ireland. The district was created on 1 April 2015. It consists of the combined area of the City of Lisburn with the Borough of Castlereagh, but not including "the localities of Gilnahirk, Tullycarnet, Braniel, Castlereagh, Merok, Cregagh, Wynchurch, Glencregagh and Belvoir, Collin Glen, Poleglass, Lagmore, Twinbrook, Kilwee and Dunmurry" which transferred to Belfast. The local authority is Lisburn and Castlereagh City Council.

Geography
The district takes in many of the outer suburbs of Belfast and had an electorate of 83,369 prior to its formation. The name of the new district was recommended on 17 September 2008. The area covered by the new Council has an estimated population of  residents.

Lisburn and Castlereagh City Council

Lisburn and Castlereagh City Council replaces Lisburn City Council and Castlereagh Borough Council. The first election for the new district council was originally due to take place in May 2009, but on 25 April 2008, Shaun Woodward, Secretary of State for Northern Ireland announced that the scheduled 2009 district council elections were to be postponed until 2011. The first elections took place on 22 May 2014 and the council acted as a shadow authority until 1 April 2015, at which date the council proper was created.

Mayor

Deputy Mayor

Councillors
For the purpose of elections the council is divided into seven district electoral areas (DEA):

Seat summary

Councillors by electoral area

† Co-opted to fill a vacancy since the election.‡ New party affiliation since the election.Last update 5 August 2022.

For further details see 2019 Lisburn and Castlereagh City Council election.

See also
 Local government in Northern Ireland
 2014 Northern Ireland local elections
 Political make-up of local councils in the United Kingdom

References

Districts of Northern Ireland, 2015-present